The 346th Test Squadron is a United States Air Force unit assigned to the 318th Cyberspace Operations Group at Joint Base San Antonio–Lackland, Texas.  The squadron tests military cyberspace operation systems.

The squadron was first activated as the 346th Bombardment Squadron in 1942.  After training in the United States, it moved to the Mediterranean Theater of Operations, where it earned two Distinguished Unit Citations in operations against the Axis Powers.  After V-E Day, the squadron remained in Italy until November 1945, when it was inactivated.  The squadron was activated in the reserves from 1947 to 1949, but does not appear to have been fully manned or equipped.

In 1953, the squadron was activated as the 346th Strategic Reconnaissance Squadron as part of Strategic Air Command.  It returned to the bombardment mission two years later, and served in this role until inactivating in 1974.  Although the squadron remained in the United States except for one deployment in the 1950s, during the Vietnam War it deployed its aircrews and Boeing B-52 Stratofortresses to Southeast Asia.  For extended periods, all squadron personnel and equipment were deployed.

The squadron was activated in 1993 as the 346th Test and Evaluation Squadron and performed operational testing and evaluation until inactivating in 1995.  It was activated in its current role in 2000.

Mission
The squadron mission is to conduct independent operational tests and evaluations, emissions security tests, and other specialized tests of cyberspace capabilities.  It operates Air Force Space Command’s cyber test & training range.  The 346th's 120 personnel include 50 active duty airmen, 30 Department of Defense civilian employees and 40 contractors.

The 346th conducts operational tests for components of weapons systems, equipment, or software to determine its operational effectiveness and suitability.  It identifies unexpected critical system performance issues that might affect system combat effectiveness before system fielding.

History

World War II
Established in early 1942 as a Boeing B-17 Flying Fortress heavy bombardment squadron; trained under Second Air Force first in the Pacific Northwest, but the poor flying weather in the northwest forced a relocation to the Midwest for the second and third phases of training.

After completion of training, the 346th departed for the Mediterranean Theater of Operations in Algeria, where the ground echelon went by ship from New York City to Marrakech, Morocco; the air echelon flying to Morrison Field, Florida, then along the South Atlantic Route to Navarin Airfield, Algeria, where the ground and air echelons of the squadron were reunited in late February 1943.  Assigned to Twelfth Air Force, the squadron engaged in combat operations in support of American ground forces in Algeria and Tunisia during the 1943 North African campaign.

Helped force the capitulation of Pantelleria Island in June 1943. Bombed in preparation for and in support of the invasions of Sicily and southern Italy in the summer and fall of 1943.  Was reassigned to the new Fifteenth Air Force in October 1943 and until the German capitulation in May 1945; engaged in strategic bombardment of enemy targets in Italy, France, Germany, Czechoslovakia, Austria, Hungary, Romania, Bulgaria, Yugoslavia, and Greece, attacking oil refineries, marshaling yards, aircraft factories, and other strategic objectives.   Squadron was demobilized in Italy in late 1945; inactivated in November.

Air Force reserve
Activated in the reserves in 1947, however unit never equipped or manned.   Inactivated in 1949 due to budget restraints.

Strategic Air Command
The squadron was reactivated in January 1953 at Fairchild Air Force Base, Washington when the 111th Strategic Reconnaissance Wing, an Air National Guard unit that had been mobilized for the Korean War, was returned to state control.  The squadron assumed the mission, personnel, and Convair RB-36 Peacemaker strategic reconnaissance aircraft of the 111th Wing's 103d Strategic Reconnaissance Squadron, which returned to the Maryland Air National Guard.  Engaged in worldwide strategic bombardment training and stood nuclear alert until 1956 when the B-36 was retired.  

Re-equipped with B-52 Stratofortresses  and continued training and nuclear alert status.   Deployed personnel and aircraft to Pacific during Vietnam War, engaging in Operation Arc Light combat missions over North Vietnam; also deployed personnel and aircraft to Thailand flying out of U-Tapao Royal Thai Naval Airfield for combat missions over Cambodia and Laos.  Inactivated in 1974 with the inactivation of parent 99th Bombardment Wing and transfer of Westover Air Force Base to the Air Force Reserve.

Test operations
The 346th's mission changed when it became the 346th Test and Evaluation Squadron in June 1993 and was activated under the 99th Test Group at Ellsworth Air Force Base, South Dakota.  For the next two years, it performed operational test and evaluation for Air Combat Command systems.  The squadron and 99th Group were inactivated at Ellsworth in 1995 as  ACC centralized its operational test and evaluation under the 53d Wing at Eglin Air Force Base, Florida. 

The squadron was again activated at Kelly Air Force Base, Texas in August 2000 as the 346th Test Squadron and assigned to the 318th Information Operations Group.  As part of the unit's focus on cyber defense, in 2014 it began participating in a joint project of the Air Force Civil Engineer Center and Twenty-Fourth Air Force to protect Air Force industrial control systems against attacks from external sources.  This project recognized that industrial control systems (systems commonly used to automate physical industrial processes such as electrical and transportation operations) have become increasingly automated, rendering them vulnerable to cyber attacks.

Lineage
 Constituted as the 346th Bombardment Squadron (Heavy) on 28 January 1942
 Activated on 1 Jun 1942
 Redesignated 346th Bombardment Squadron, Heavy on 29 September 1944
 Inactivated on 8 November 1945
 Redesignated 346th Bombardment Squadron, Very Heavy on 13 May 1947
 Activated in the reserve on 29 May 1947
 Inactivated on 27 June 1949
 Redesignated 346th Strategic Reconnaissance Squadron, Heavy and activated on 1 January 1953
 Redesignated 346th Bombardment Squadron, Heavy on 1 October 1955
 Inactivated on 31 March 1974
 Redesignated 346th Test and Evaluation Squadron on 1 June 1993
 Activated on 15 June 1993
 Inactivated on 21 September 1995
 Redesignated 346 Test Squadron on 17 July 2000
 Activated on 1 August 2000

Assignments
 99th Bombardment Group, 1 June 1942 – 8 November 1945
 99th Bombardment Group, 29 May 1947 – 27 June 1949
 99th Strategic Reconnaissance Wing (later 99th Bombardment Wing), 1 January 1953 – 31 March 1974
 99th Test Group, 15 June 1993 – 21 September 1995
 318th Information Operations Group (later 318th Cyberspace Operations Group), 1 Aug 2000 – present

Stations

 Orlando Army Air Base, Florida, 1 June 1942
 MacDill Field, Florida, 1 June 1942
 Pendleton Field, Oregon, 29 June 1942
 Gowen Field, Idaho, 28 August 1942
 Walla Walla Army Air Field, Washington, 25 September 1942
 Sioux City Army Air Base, Iowa, 18 November 1942 – 3 January 1943
 Navarin Airfield, Algeria, 16 March 1943

 Oudna Airfield, Tunisia, 5 August 1943
 Tortorella Airfield, Italy, c. 13 December 1943
 Marcianise Airfield, Italy, c. 27 October – 8 November 1945
 Birmingham Municipal Airport, Alabama, 29 May 1947 – 27 June 1949
 Fairchild Air Force Base, Washington, 1 January 1953
 Westover Air Force Base, Massachusetts, 4 September 1956 – 31 March 1974
 Ellsworth Air Force Base, South Dakota, 15 June 199 – 21 September 1995
 Kelly Air Force Base (later Kelly Field Annex, Lackland Air Force Base, Joint Base San Antonio-Lackland), Texas 1 Aug 2000 – present

Aircraft
 Boeing B-17 Flying Fortress, 1942–1945
 Convair B-36 Peacemaker, 1953–1956
 Convair RB-36 Peacemaker, 1953–1956
 Boeing B-52 Stratofortress, 1956–1974

Awards and campaigns

See also

 List of B-52 Units of the United States Air Force

References
 Notes

 Citations

Bibliography

External links
 
 

Test squadrons of the United States Air Force
Military units and formations in Texas